Dayna Edwards (born 14 March 1985) is a New Zealand-born Australian rugby union player. His position of choice is prop and he currently plays for FC Grenoble in the Pro D2.  He previously played for the Queensland Reds in Super Rugby between 2007 and 2009.

References

Australian rugby union players
Rugby union props
1985 births
Living people
Rugby union players from Whanganui
Queensland Reds players